Paul Einhorn (born in Iecava, Latvia, the exact birth date is not known, died in 1655 in Jelgava) was a famous historian of the Latvians and a Lutheran pastor.

In 1615 Paul Einhorn studied at the university of Rostock.
He was a pastor from 1621 and superintendent of Courland from 1636. He is described as an ardent Lutheran, and he spent much effort fighting against superstition.  He received a good classical education which is also seen in his works, which gained its importance because of their description of Latvian pre-Christian beliefs, which he tried to exterminate.

He has published number of books:

 1627 — "Wiederlegunge der Abgötterey..."
 1636 — "Reformatio gentis Letticae..."

But he is mostly known because of his historical book about Latvians published in 1649 — "Historia Lettica" (das ist Beschreibung der Lettischen Nation in welcher von der Letten als alten Einwohner und Besitzer des Lieflandes, Curlandes und Semgallen Namen, Uhrsprung oder Ankunfft ihrem Gottes-Dienst, ihrer Republica oder Regimente so sie in der Heydenschafft gehabt, auch ihren Sitten, Geberden, Gewonheiten, Natur und Eigenschaften etc. gruendlich und uembstaendig Meldung geschickt. Der Teutschen Nation und allen der Historischen Warheit Liebhabern zu einem noethigen Unterricht zusammen getragen und in den Druck verfertiget durch Paulum Einhorn, Fuerstlichen Curlaendischen Superintendenten P.M. Dorpt in Liefland Gedruckt durch Johann Vogeln, der Koenigl. Acad. Buchdruker, im Jahr 1649).

References 

Year of birth missing
1655 deaths
People from Iecava
People from the Duchy of Courland and Semigallia
Baltic-German people
Historians of Latvia
17th-century German historians
German male non-fiction writers